Germaine Dermoz (born Germaine Deluermoz, 30 July 1888 – 6 November 1966) was a French film and theatre actress of the early-to-mid twentieth century.

She performed in over twenty theatre productions, frequently in the Théâtre Réjane.
Her film career took place mostly during the silent movie era. She is most famous for her portrayal of Madame Beudet in The Smiling Madame Beudet.

She had an older sister, actress Jeanne Delvair née Duluermoz (1877-1949), and a younger brother, Henri Deluermoz (1876-1943), who was a painter.

Filmography

 1908 : Méprise
 1908 : L'Amour qui tue
 1909 : The Dragoons Under Louis XIV
 1909 : The Dragonad
 1909 : Les Chasseurs de fourrures
 1909 : The Death of the Duke D'Enghien
 1909 : Beethoven
 1909 : La Fin d'un tyran
 1909 : Madame de Langeais
 1909 : The Duchess of Langeais
 1910 : Barberine
 1910 : Eugénie Grandet
 1910 : L'Étranger
 1910 : King Phillip the Fair and the Templars
 1910 : Caïn
 1911 : The Last Days of King Henry II of France
 1911 : Olivier Cromwell
 1911 : Milton
 1911 : Le Rideau noir
 1911 : La Nouvelle Servante
 1911 : L'Assassinat de Henri III
 1912 : Le Mystère du pont Notre-Dame
 1912 : Les Trois Sultanes
 1912 : Parmi les pierres
 1912 : The Forger
 1912 : La Joie qui tue
 1913 : Little Jack
 1913 : Le Ruisseau
 1913 : 
 1913 : De afwezige
 1913 : Harding's Heritage
 1914 : Les Habits noirs
 1914 : La Tache
 1918 : Le Masque d'amour
 1918 : La Marâtre
 1918 : L'Énigme
 1919 : Fanny Lear
 1920 : Five Doomed Gentlemen
 1920 : Petit ange
 1921 : Les Naufragés du sort
 1923 : The Smiling Madame Beudet
 1925 : La Course du flambeau
 1930 : L'Arlésienne
 1930 : The Dream 
 1931 : Le Bal
 1932 : Le Crime du chemin rouge
 1933 : Bagnes d'enfants
 1934 : The Bread Peddler 
 1934 : Moscow Nights
 1937 : Les anges noirs
 1938 : Heroes of the Marne
 1938 : Remontons les Champs-Élysées
 1940 : La vie est magnifique
 1942 : Andorra ou les hommes d'Airain
 1943 : Monsieur des Lourdines
 1947 : Monsieur Vincent
 1948 : The Murdered Model
 1950 : The Prize
 1952 : Carrot Top
 1952 : The Red Head 
 1953 : Children of Love
 1955 : Caroline and the Rebels
 1956 : If Paris Were Told to Us
 1956 : The Width of the Pavement
 1963 : The Reluctant Spy

Theatre 
 1907 : La Course du flambeau by Paul Hervieu, Théâtre Réjane.
 1907 : Raffles by Ernest William Hornung and Eugene Wiley Presbrey, Théâtre Réjane. 
 1907 : Après le pardon by Mathilde Sérao and Pierre Decourcelle, Théâtre Réjane. 
 1908 : L'Impératrice by Catulle Mendès, Théâtre Réjane. 
 1908 : Qui perd gagne by Pierre Veber and Alfred Capus, Théâtre Réjane. 
 1908 : Trains de luxe by Abel Hermant, Théâtre Réjane. 
 1909 : Madame Margot by Émile Moreau and Charles Clairville, Théâtre Réjane. 
 1913 : Le Phalène by Henry Bataille, Théâtre du Vaudeville.
 1920 : Le Règne de Messaline by Armand Bour, Théâtre des Variétés. 
 1920 : Le Simoun by Henri-René Lenormand, mise en scène Gaston Baty, Comédie Montaigne.
 1921 : Le Chemin de Damas by Pierre Wolff, Théâtre du Vaudeville.
 1924 : Le Bien-aîmé by Jacques Deval, Théâtre de la Renaissance. 
 1925 : Le Bel Amour by Edmond Sée, Théâtre Fémina. 
 1927 : Berlioz by Charles Méré, mise en scène Émile Couvelaine, Théâtre de la Porte-Saint-Martin.
 1932 : Andromaque by Racine, Théâtre Antoine. 
 1934 : Un roi, deux dames et un valet by François Porche, Comédie des Champs-Élysées. 
 1936 : Elizabeth, la femme sans homme by André Josset, mise en scène René Rocher, Théâtre du Vieux-Colombier.
 1937 : Le Simoun by Henri-René Lenormand, mise en scène Camille Corney, Théâtre des Célestins.
 1938 : Frénésie by Charles de Peyret-Chappuis, mise en scène Charles de Rochefort, Théâtre Charles de Rochefort.
 1938 : Les Parents terribles by Jean Cocteau, mise en scène Alice Cocéa, Théâtre des Ambassadeurs. 
 1941 : L'Amazone aux bas bleus by Albert Boussac de Saint-Marc, mise en scène Paulette Pax, Théâtre de l'Œuvre.
 1942 : Les Dieux de la nuit by Charles de Peyret-Chappuis, mise en scène Camille Corney, Théâtre Hébertot.
 1953 : Le Piège à l'innocent by Eduardo Sola Franco, mise en scène Jean Le Poulain, Théâtre de l'Œuvre.
 1954 : Un inspecteur vous demande by John Boynton Priestley, Théâtre La Bruyère. 
 1955 : Pour Lucrèce by Jean Giraudoux, mise en scène Jean-Louis Barrault, Théâtre des Célestins.

External links 
 

French stage actresses
French film actresses
French silent film actresses
20th-century French actresses
1888 births
1966 deaths
Actresses from Paris